John W. Fischer (March 10, 1912 – May 25, 1984) was an American amateur golfer in the 1930s.

Fischer was born in Cincinnati, Ohio. He won the 1932 NCAA individual golf championship and the Big Ten Conference individual championship in 1932, 1933 and 1935 while playing at the University of Michigan. He also won the 1936 U.S. Amateur.

Fischer played on the Walker Cup team in 1934, 1936, and 1938, and captained the team in 1965.

Fischer was inducted into the University of Michigan Athletic Hall of Honor in 1980 as part of the third induction class.  Only one Michigan golfer (Chuck Kocsis) was inducted into the Hall of Honor before Fischer.

Tournament wins
this list may be incomplete
1932 NCAA Championship
1932 Big Ten Championship
1933 Big Ten Championship
1935 Big Ten Championship
1936 U.S. Amateur

Major championships

Amateur wins (1)

Results timeline

Source for U.S. Open and U.S. Amateur: USGA Championship Database

Source for 1934 British Amateur:  The Glasgow Herald, May 24, 1934, pg. 12.

Source for 1938 British Amateur:  The Glasgow Herald, May 25, 1938, pg. 21.

M = Medalist
NT = No tournament
DNP = Did not play
DNQ = Did not qualify for match play portion
R128, R64, R32, R16, QF, SF = Round in which player lost in match play
"T" indicates a tie for a place
Green background for wins. Yellow background for top-10

U.S. national team appearances
Amateur
Walker Cup: 1934 (winners), 1936 (winners), 1938, 1965 (non-playing captain, tied, cup retained)

References

American male golfers
Amateur golfers
Michigan Wolverines men's golfers
Golfers from Ohio
Sportspeople from Cincinnati
1912 births
1984 deaths